Bohun can refer to:

People

 Bohun family, of England during the 13th and 14th centuries
 Eleanor de Bohun (c.1366–1399); elder sister and co-heiress of Mary de Bohun
 Henry de Bohun, 1st Earl of Hereford (1176–1220); a Norman-English nobleman
 Henry de Bohun (d. 1314); English knight killed at Bannockburn
 Hugh Bohun, a pen name of Bernard Cronin (1884–1968), author and journalist
 Humphrey de Bohun (disambiguation), multiple people with the name
 Ivan Bohun (died 1664), a Ukrainian Cossack military leader
 John Bohun, Abbot of Bury St Edmunds, 1453–1469
 Lawrence Bohun (d. 1621); English physician and member of the Virginia Governor's Council
 Mary de Bohun (c. 1368–1394); the first wife of King Henry IV of England and mother of King Henry V
 William de Bohun, 1st Earl of Northampton (ca. 1312 – 1360); English nobleman and military commander who won the Battle of Crécy

Fictional character
 Yuri Bohun, a fictional Cossack character in the novel With Fire and Sword (1884) by Polish writer Henryk Sienkiewicz

Other
 Bohun, Iran, a village in Isfahan Province, Iran
 Bohun, a novel by Jacek Komuda